The Military Philosophers is the ninth of Anthony Powell's twelve-novel sequence A Dance to the Music of Time. First published in 1968, it covers the latter part of Nicholas Jenkins' service in World War II.

1968 British novels
Novels by Anthony Powell
A Dance to the Music of Time
Novels set during World War II
Heinemann (publisher) books